André Kiesewetter (born 20 August 1969) is an East German/German former ski jumper.

Career
He won the bronze medal in the team large hill and 7th in the individual large hillat at the 1991 FIS Nordic World Ski Championships and had his best and two World Cup wins in Lake Placid and Sapporo. 

On 23 March 1991, he crashed as trial jumper at ski jumping world record distance at 196 metres (643 ft) back home on Velikanka bratov Gorišek K185 in Planica, Yugoslavia.

World Cup

Standings

Wins

Invalid ski jumping world record
This is the longest parallel style ski jump in history.

 Not recognized! Ground touch at world record distance.

References

External links 

1969 births
Living people
People from Neuhaus am Rennweg
German male ski jumpers
FIS Nordic World Ski Championships medalists in ski jumping
Sportspeople from Thuringia